A referendum on lowering the voting age from 21 to 20 was held in Denmark on 21 September 1971. The change was approved by 56.5% of voters, with a turnout of 86.2%. A previous referendum had been unsuccessful in lowering the electoral age to 18 years, which was introduced after a 1978 referendum and which still stands.

Results

References

Referendums in Denmark
Denmark
Electoral age referendum
Suffrage referendums
Electoral reform in Denmark
September 1971 events in Europe